Drosophila mauritiana is a species of fly, belonging to the family Drosophilidae. It belongs to the Drosophila melanogaster species subgroup. It is found in Mauritius.

The Mariner transposon Mos1 (for Mosaic element) was discovered in Drosophila mauritiana.

See also 
 List of Drosophila species

References

External links 
 
 
 
 Drosophila mauritiana at insectoid.info

mautitiana
Insects described in 1974
Insects of Mauritius
Endemic fauna of Mauritius